Manila Broadcasting Company (MBC) is a radio and television network in the Philippines. MBC is currently owned by the FJE Group of Companies of Fred J. Elizalde, which also operates hotels and Pasay-based amusement park Star City. Its AM flagship network, DZRH is the oldest radio station in the country while its FM flagship network, Love Radio is the top station in FM radio ratings in Metro Manila (until 2017, and again in 2020) and several key cities.

MBC's corporate headquarters and studios are located at the MBC Building, Star City, Vicente Sotto St., CCP Complex, Pasay, Metro Manila.

MBC forms its own network group with six national brands, specifically, DZRH radio and DZRH News Television, Aksyon Radyo, Love Radio, Yes The Best, Easy Rock, and Radyo Natin; operated either directly by MBC, or through its affiliate-licensees Pacific Broadcasting Systems, Cebu Broadcasting Company, Radyo Natin Network, and Philippine Broadcasting Corporation.

DZRH News Television, which is an extension of the DZRH brand into an audio-visual platform, is carried by some 1,000 cable providers throughout the Philippine archipelago.

The current president of MBC is Ruperto Nicdao Jr.

History

The Heacock era
The origins of MBC can be traced to DZRH, which first went on air as KZRH on the morning of July 15, 1939, by the Heacock Company, a prominent department store based in Escolta Street, Binondo, Manila. Years later, it bought KZRC (now DYRC) from Isaac Beck in Cebu City. The Japanese took over the stations and KZRH became PIAM (Philippine Islands AM) for their propaganda use.

The birth of MBC and DZRH
After World War II, the Elizalde brothers (Federico "Fred", Joaquin Miguel "Mike" and Manuel "Manolo") took over KZRH and KYRC. With the help of station manager Bertrand Silen, KZRH transferred its operations to the Insular Life Building in Plaza Cervantes. In June 1946, the Elizaldes established the network under the Manila Broadcasting Company (incorporated on September 30, 1947).

KZRH returned to the airwaves on July 1, 1946. On July 4, 1946, it aired the live coverage of the Philippine independence from the United States and the inauguration of the third Philippine Republic.

In 1948, after the international telecommunications conference in the United States where the Philippines changed its first letter to "D", KZRH changed its callsign to DZRH, and has been expanded to over 30 stations nationwide. The same year, MBC launched its sister station in Manila, DZMB (thru the establishment of Cebu Broadcasting Company) and DZPI (thru Philippine Broadcasting Corporation that the Elizaldes acquired from the Soriano family).

In 1949, DZRH began airing the first radio drama, Gulong ng Palad.
 
Ben Aniceto began his long media career, working with DZRH, DZMB, and DZPI as a radio talent.

In 1956, MBC moved to its own Radio Center along Taft Avenue in Ermita, Manila. In the same year, Philippine radio gained popularity and AM radio became lucrative in what was considered as the golden years.

1960s to Marcos dictatorship
When then-president Ferdinand Marcos declared Martial Law in 1972, MBC was temporarily closed for a few months.

In 1975, MBC ventured into the FM band when its stations DZMB and other MBC music AM stations (such as DYBU in Cebu) moved to FM radio. This would become the nucleus of MBC's Love Radio Network.

The expansion of MBC
In 1985, Manolo Elizalde retired. His son, Fred J. Elizalde, became chairman and CEO.

After the People Power Revolution ended the Marcos dictatorship in 1986, MBC began to expand its FM stations (Love Radio Network) while DZRH continued to broadcast nationwide. Ruperto Nicdao, Jr. became a board member of MBC in 1988 before he became president of MBC.

In January 1992, the application of MBC and Springs Foundation's Channel 11 (DWXI-TV) to operate was denied by the National Telecommunications Commission, stating that it is "not legally, technically, and financially qualified". The channel was later acquired by Eddie Villanueva's ZOE Broadcasting Network and renamed DZOE-TV in 1998.

In 1994, DZRH relaunched itself as "One Nation, One Station" by launching the first nationwide satellite broadcast.

In July 2002, MBC studios were transferred from FJE Building in Makati to CCP Complex in Pasay.

MBC co-hosted the Aliwan Fiesta since 2003, in partnership with Cultural Center of the Philippines, and the cities of Manila and Pasay. Aliwan Fiesta is an annual event that gathers different cultural festivals of the Philippines in Star City in Pasay wherein contingents compete in dance parade and float competitions, as well as in a beauty pageant.

After 35 years, MBC returned to television with the launch of DZRH News Television on October 1, 2007.

Acquisitions, new networks, and changes
In 1995, MBC acquired DWKS-FM and changed its callsign to DWST as 101.1 Showbiz Tsismis. It lasts until 1998 and relaunched as Yes FM. During the 1990s, DYRC was spun off into Aksyon Radyo, established in 11 provincial AM stations.

On December 16, 1997, MBC launched Radyo Natin. Composed of 100 FM stations strategically across the nation by using state of the art satellite technology, Radyo Natin is able to reach audiences that has never been reached before by another radio station.

In January 1999, Hot FM was launched in Dagupan, Cebu City, General Santos and Zamboanga City, with more than 50 minor provincial radio stations (under the consortium with Radyo Natin).

In October 2008, MBC acquired DWRK from ACWS-United Broadcasting Network. Seven months later in May 2009, DWRK was relaunched as Easy Rock.

In 2017, Hot FM was unofficially ceased itself as most of the remaining Hot FM stations were rebranded and switched to Radyo Natin.

In 2018, MBC began to test broadcast its TV channel DZRH News Television on digital free TV using ISDB-T in Cebu, Bacolod and Iloilo.

2019 fire

MBC main offices and studios were affected by a major fire that originated in the nearby theme park and sister company Star City on October 2, 2019. While regular programming for its AM station DZRH was suspended as a result of the fire, MBC Manila radio stations transferred its operations and broadcasts, in interim, at BSA Twin Towers, in Ortigas Center, Mandaluyong, where its FM transmitters are located. One month later on November 11, the MBC studios and offices transferred again at the Design Center of the Philippines, which is near the MBC Building.

On November 15, 2021, after a two-year hiatus, MBC studios and offices returned to the newly renovated MBC Building at the Star City complex (which was still under rehabilitation and reconstruction), except for DZRH which would later be relocated on December 17. On the same day, MBC relaunched its new corporate slogan, Sama-Sama Tayo, Pilipino! along with the new logos of all MBC radio stations.

Franchise renewal
On October 30, 2018, Philippine President Rodrigo Duterte signed Republic Act No. 11109 which renewed MBC's license for another 25 years. The law grants MBC a franchise to construct, install, operate, and maintain, for commercial purposes, radio broadcasting stations and television stations, including digital television system, with the corresponding facilities such as relay stations, throughout the Philippines.

MBC Media Group

Radio networks

Defunct networks

DZRH News Television

Subsidiaries / Affiliates

Cebu Broadcasting Company
Pacific Broadcasting System
Philippine Broadcasting Corporation
Operation Tulong - MBC's corporate social responsibility program.
Elizalde Hotels and Resorts (80%)
365 Talent Management - MBC's talent management unit

External links
Media Ownership Monitor Philippines - Media Companies: A Duopoly Rules by VERA Files and Reporters Without Borders

References

 
1946 establishments in the Philippines
Companies based in Pasay
Companies listed on the Philippine Stock Exchange
Mass media companies established in 1946
Mass media companies of the Philippines
Philippine radio networks
Radio stations in the Philippines
Television networks in the Philippines